KEOK (102.1 FM, "Lakes Country 102.1") is a radio station licensed to serve the community of Tahlequah, OK United States. The station, established in 1973, is currently owned and operated by Payne 5 Communications, LLC.

KEOK broadcasts a country music format to the Tahlequah, Oklahoma area.

External links
 Lakes Country 102.1 Website
 

EOK